Luis Miguel Ralda Moreno (born 17 January 1963) was Minister of National Defense of Guatemala.

References

Living people
Defense Ministers of Guatemala
1963 births